Abel Casquete (18 July 1997) is an Ecuadorian footballer who plays as a midfielder for Guayaquil City.

Club career 

Casquete is a youth exponent from River Plate. He made his league debut at 18 July 2015 against Atlético Rafaela in a 1-5 away win. He replaced Augusto Solari after 62 minutes.

References

1997 births
Living people
Association football midfielders
Ecuadorian footballers
Ecuadorian expatriate footballers
Club Atlético River Plate footballers
Barcelona S.C. footballers
C.D. Universidad Católica del Ecuador footballers
Deportivo Morón footballers
Zulia F.C. players
Argentine Primera División players
Ecuadorian Serie A players
Venezuelan Primera División players
Expatriate footballers in Argentina
Expatriate footballers in Venezuela
Ecuadorian expatriate sportspeople in Argentina
Ecuadorian expatriate sportspeople in Venezuela